Alfonso Gonzaga (died 1649) was a Roman Catholic prelate who served as Titular Archbishop of Rhodus (1621–1649).

Biography
Alfonso Gonzaga  was born in Novellara, Italy in 1588. On 17 March 1621, Alfonso Gonzaga was appointed during the papacy of Pope Gregory XV as Titular Archbishop of Rhodus. On 18 April 1621, he was consecrated bishop by Bonifazio Bevilacqua Aldobrandini, Cardinal-Priest of Santa Maria in Trastevere.  He served as Titular Archbishop of Rhodus until his death in 1649 in Reggio Emilia, Italy.

Episcopal succession

References 

17th-century Roman Catholic titular bishops
Bishops appointed by Pope Gregory XV
1649 deaths
1588 births